The Right Reverend K. B. Yesu Prasad  is Bishop Emeritus - in - Rayalaseema Diocese of the Church of South India who served as bishop from 2006 through 2012.

Prasada Rao had his ministerial formation at the Andhra Christian Theological College, Hyderabad, affiliated to the nation's first University, the Senate of Serampore College (University), where he studied Bachelor of Divinity.

In 2006, the Most Reverend B. P. Sugandhar, then Moderator principally consecrated Vara Prasad at the Cathedral in Kadapa.

References

Christian clergy from Andhra Pradesh
Telugu people
20th-century Christian clergy
21st-century Anglican bishops in India
Anglican bishops of Rayalaseema
Indian Christian theologians
Senate of Serampore College (University) alumni
Living people
Year of birth missing (living people)
Church of South India clergy
Indian bishops